First Love is a 1959 Italian romantic drama film directed by Mario Camerini and starring Carla Gravina.

Plot

Cast 
   
Carla Gravina as  Betty Hauptmann
Lorella De Luca as Francesca
 Raf Mattioli as  Piero
Geronimo Meynier as  Luigi Lojacono, aka Giggi
Christine Kaufmann as  Silvia
 Luciano Marin as  Marco
Paola Quattrini as Andreina Palazzi
 Marcello Paolini as  Lello Amaduzzi
 Nicolò De Guido as  Enrico Boschetti
Katie Boyle as Miss Luciana 
Luciana Angiolillo as  Anna 
Mario Carotenuto as  Armando Amaduzzi 
Emma Baron as Miss Maria Lojacono 
Barbara Florian as  Daniela Fabbri
Carlo Giuffré as  Michele Lojacono 
 Salvo Libassi as  Dr. Arrigo Lojacono 
Mario Pisu as  Paolo 
 Edoardo Toniolo as  Pietro 
Raimondo Van Riel as Professor Palazzi 
 Mario Meniconi as  The Doorman
Fabrizio Capucci as Marco's Friend
Gian Paolo Rosmino as  Pino 
Nietta Zocchi as  Teresa

References

External links

Italian romantic drama films
1959 romantic drama films
1959 films
Films directed by Mario Camerini
Italian black-and-white films
1950s Italian films